A list of films produced in Argentina in 1978:

External links and references
 Argentine films of 1978 at the Internet Movie Database

1978
Argentine
Films